Sainte-Opportune-du-Bosc is a commune in the Eure department in Normandy in northern France.

History
In 935 a big battle between William I, Duke of Normandy and Robert II took place near the town. The battlefield was called Champ-de-Bataille later and in the 17th century the Marshall of Créqui built a castle there.

The Château du Champ de Bataille was owned by the Harcourt family and has formal gardens designed by Le Nôtre.

Population

See also
Communes of the Eure department

References

Communes of Eure